Kim Keum-soo (25 December 1937 – 25 October 2022) was a South Korean labor activist.

Kim died on 25 October 2022, at the age of 84.

References

1937 births
2022 deaths
South Korean activists
Korean trade unionists
People from Miryang